A seme, simi or ol alem is a type of dagger or short sword used by the Maasai and Kikuyu peoples of Kenya in East Africa.
They have a distinctive leaf-shaped blade, with a relatively rounded point. Scabbards are generally made of wood covered with rawhide, and dyed red.

See also 
List of daggers

Notes

Further reading
 George Cameron Stone, Donald J. LaRocca, A Glossary of the Construction, Decoration and Use of Arms and Armor: in All Countries and in All Times, Verlag Courier Dover Publications, 1999, 
 Nick Evangelista: The encyclopedia of the sword, Verlag Greenwood Publishing Group, 1995, 

Daggers
African weapons